Odostomia farallonensis is a species of sea snail, a marine gastropod mollusc in the family Pyramidellidae, the pyrams and their allies.

Description
The shell is very elongate-ovate, deeply umbilicated, light yellow. Its length measures 5.5 mm. The whorls of the protoconch are very deeply immersed. The five whorls of the teleoconch are very slightly rounded in the middle between the sutures, more strongly so near the anterior end and toward the summit. The summit is strongly narrowly tabulate. The periphery of the body whorl is inflated. The base of the shell is very strongly suddenly rounded, widely and deeply umbilicated. The entire surface is marked by numerous fine, closely spaced, spiral striations. The aperture is broadly ovate. The posterior angle is obtuse. The outer lip is thin. The columella is very slender, strongly curved, revolute, and  provided with a deep fold a little below its insertion. The parietal wall is glazed with a thin callus.

Distribution
This species occurs in the Pacific Ocean off the Farallon Islands, California.

References

External links
 To World Register of Marine Species

farallonensis
Gastropods described in 1909